Clifton House, previously known as Sandy Tavern, is a historic building located at 473 Bethlehem Pike in Fort Washington, Pennsylvania.

During the autumn of 1777, George Washington's Continental Army spent six weeks camped at nearby Whitemarsh. Colonels Clement Biddle (the "Quaker General" and member of one of Philadelphia's prominent families) and Stephen Moylan, and General George Wheedon, were quartered here during the encampment.

The house that currently stands on the property was built in 1801.  At the time of the American Revolution, it was known as the Sandy Tavern.

Today, the Clifton House is a library and museum operated by the Fort Washington Historical Society, and also serves as the society's headquarters.

See also
Hope Lodge

References

Sources

External links
Map: 
Ambler History - The Clifton House

American_Revolutionary_War_sites
Taverns in Pennsylvania
Taverns in the American Revolution
Museums in Montgomery County, Pennsylvania
History museums in Pennsylvania
Houses in Montgomery County, Pennsylvania
Houses completed in 1801